Phyllagathis is a genus of flowering plants in the family Melastomataceae, native to India, southern China, Southeast Asia, and Malesia. The taxon is believed to be highly polyphyletic.

Species
Currently accepted species include:

Phyllagathis asarifolia C.Chen
Phyllagathis atroviolacea C.Hansen ex Cellin.
Phyllagathis beccariana (Cogn.) M.P.Nayar
Phyllagathis bicolor C.W.Lin, Chien F.Chen & T.Y.A.Yang
Phyllagathis brevipedunculata C.Hansen
Phyllagathis brookei M.P.Nayar
Phyllagathis cavaleriei Guillaumin
Phyllagathis cordata Ridl.
Phyllagathis cymigera C.Chen
Phyllagathis deltoda C.Chen
Phyllagathis dichotoma C.Hansen
Phyllagathis driessenioides C.Hansen
Phyllagathis elattandra Diels
Phyllagathis elliptica Stapf
Phyllagathis erecta (S.Y.Hu) C.Y.Wu ex C.Chen
Phyllagathis fengii C.Hansen
Phyllagathis gigantifolia M.P.Nayar
Phyllagathis gracilis (Hand.-Mazz.) C.Chen
Phyllagathis griffithii King
Phyllagathis guillauminii H.L.Li
Phyllagathis guttata (Stapf) Cellin.
Phyllagathis gymnantha Korth.
Phyllagathis hainanensis (Merr. & Chun) C.Chen
Phyllagathis hispida King
Phyllagathis hispidissima (C.Chen) C.Chen
Phyllagathis indica J.Mathew, Yohannan & Kad.V.George
Phyllagathis jacobsiana (M.P.Nayar) Cellin.
Phyllagathis lii C.W.Lin, Chien F.Chen & T.Y.A.Yang
Phyllagathis longicalcarata C.Hansen
Phyllagathis longifolius (Cogn.) J.F.Maxwell
Phyllagathis longispicatus (Cogn.) J.F.Maxwell
Phyllagathis marumiaetricha (Guillaumin) C.Hansen
Phyllagathis maxwellii B.C.Stone & A.Weber
Phyllagathis megalocentra C.Hansen
Phyllagathis melastomatoides (Merr. & Chun) W.C.Ko
Phyllagathis millelunata C.W.Lin, Chien F.Chen & T.Y.A.Yang
Phyllagathis nanakorniana Wangwasit, Norsaengsri & Cellin.
Phyllagathis osmantha (M.P.Nayar) Cellin.
Phyllagathis ovalifolia H.L.Li
Phyllagathis peltata Stapf ex Ridl.
Phyllagathis penrissenensis Cellin.
Phyllagathis phamhoangii V.T.Pham, V.T.Chinh & Ranil
Phyllagathis phyllioides C.W.Lin, Chien F.Chen & T.Y.A.Yang
Phyllagathis prostrata C.Hansen
Phyllagathis pulcherrima M.P.Nayar
Phyllagathis rajah C.W.Lin, Chien F.Chen & T.Y.A.Yang
Phyllagathis rivularis C.W.Lin, Chien F.Chen & T.Y.A.Yang
Phyllagathis rotundifolia (Jack) Blume
Phyllagathis rubrosetosa C.W.Lin, Chien F.Chen & T.Y.A.Yang
Phyllagathis rufa (Stapf) Cellin.
Phyllagathis scorpiothyrsoides C.Chen
Phyllagathis scortechinii King
Phyllagathis sessilifolia C.Hansen
Phyllagathis setotheca H.L.Li
Phyllagathis siamensis Cellin. & S.S.Renner
Phyllagathis steenisii Cellin.
Phyllagathis stellata C.W.Lin & C.H.Lee
Phyllagathis stenophylla (Merr. & Chun) H.L.Li
Phyllagathis stolonifera Kiew
Phyllagathis subacaulis (Cogn.) Cellin.
Phyllagathis suberalata C.Hansen
Phyllagathis subrotunda C.Hansen
Phyllagathis tentaculifera C.Hansen
Phyllagathis ternata C.Chen
Phyllagathis tetrandra Diels
Phyllagathis tonkinensis Stapf
Phyllagathis truncata C.Hansen
Phyllagathis tuberculata King
Phyllagathis tuberosa (C.Hansen) Cellin. & S.S.Renner
Phyllagathis ulu C.W.Lin, Chien F.Chen & T.Y.A.Yang
Phyllagathis velutina (Diels) C.Chen
Phyllagathis violinifolia C.W.Lin, Chien F.Chen & T.Y.A.Yang
Phyllagathis wallacei C.W.Lin, Chien F.Chen & T.Y.A.Yang
Phyllagathis yodae C.W.Lin, Chien F.Chen & T.Y.A.Yang

References

Melastomataceae genera
Melastomataceae